Martin Schwartz may refer to:

 Martin S. Schwartz (born 1945), American stock trader
 Martin Schwartz (mercenary) (died 1487), German mercenary
 Martin Schwartz (rower) (born 1971), American lightweight rower